Edde is a name which is used both a given name and a surname. People with the name include:

Surname
 Émile Eddé (1886–1949), Lebanese lawyer and politician
 Carlos Eddé (born 1956), Lebanese politician 
 Michel Eddé (1928–2019), Lebanese lawyer and politician
 Ragi Edde (born 1985), Lebanese swimmer
 Raymond Eddé (1913–2000), Lebanese politician

Given name
 Edde Gleerup (1860–1928), Swedish soldier and explorer